Lorzadeh Mosque is related to the 14th century Solar Hijri calendar (20th Century CE) and is located in Tehran, Lorzadeh Street. The coordinates of the Mosque are 35.666074, 51.439844.

References

Mosques in Tehran
Mosque buildings with domes
National works of Iran